Pavel Aleksandrovich Deobald (born 25 June 1990) is a Russian professional football player.

Club career
He made his Russian Football National League debut for FC Shinnik Yaroslavl on 8 April 2013 in a game against FC Khimki.

On 23 June 2018, he returned to FC Shinnik Yaroslavl.

International
He represented Russia at the 2009 Maccabiah Games.

References

External links
 
 

1990 births
Living people
Footballers from Moscow
Russian footballers
Jewish footballers
Association football midfielders
FC Lokomotiv Moscow players
FC Shinnik Yaroslavl players
FC Arsenal Tula players
FC Armavir players
FC Mordovia Saransk players
FC Tom Tomsk players
FC Noah players
Russian First League players
Russian Second League players
Armenian Premier League players
Kazakhstan Premier League players
Russian expatriate footballers
Expatriate footballers in Armenia
Russian expatriate sportspeople in Armenia
Expatriate footballers in Kazakhstan
Maccabiah Games competitors for Russia
Maccabiah Games footballers
Competitors at the 2009 Maccabiah Games
FC Turan players